Vilija Blinkevičiūtė (born 3 March 1960 in Linkuva, Lithuania) is a Lithuanian lawyer and politician, Member of the European Parliament and former long-term Minister for Social Security and Labour. Blinkevičiūtė is a member of the Social Democratic Party of Lithuania since 2006.

Early life and education
Blinkevičiūtė was born in Linkuva, Lithuania. After graduation with honours from Linkuva Secondary School, she entered Law Faculty of the Vilnius State University, from which she graduated in 1983, having obtained the qualification of Master of Laws.

Political career
Since 1983, Blinkevičiūtė has dedicated all her professional life to working in the Ministry of Social Security and Labour until she turned to politics and became a Vice Minister of Social Security and Labour in 1996.

In 2000 Blinkevičiūtė was appointed as Minister for Social Security and Labour, first in the government of Prime Minister Rolandas Paksas. She remained in the post until 2008.

Between 2004 and 2009 Blinkevičiūtė was member of Seimas.

Member of the European Parliament, 2009–present
In 2009 and in 2014 Blinkevičiūtė has been elected to the European Parliament, as the representative of the Social Democratic Party of Lithuania. In the European Parliament, she belongs to the Group of the Progressive Alliance of Socialists and Democrats.

Following the 2014 elections, Blinkevičiūtė became a Vice-Chair of the Committee on Women's Rights and Gender Equality (FEMM); she was elected the Chair of the committee in January 2017.

In addition, Blinkevičiūtė is a full member of the Committee on Employment and Social Affairs (EMPL) and of the Delegation to Euronest Parliamentary Assembly, and a substitute member of the Civil Liberties, Justice and Home Affairs Committee. She also belongs to the Intergroup on Disability and the Intergroup on Children’s Rights and to the Intergroup on Extreme Poverty and Human Rights.

Recognition
In 2004 Blinkevičiūtė was bestowed with the Cross of Commander of the Order for Merits to Lithuania.

References

 Profile of Vilija Blinkevičiūtė on the official website of Seimas (Parliament) of the Republic of Lithuania
 2014 elections to the European Parliament - candidates of the Lithuanian Social Democratic Party

External links
 
Profile of Vilija Blinkevičiūtė on the official website of the European Parliament

1960 births
Living people
Women MEPs for Lithuania
Lithuanian jurists
MEPs for Lithuania 2009–2014
MEPs for Lithuania 2014–2019
MEPs for Lithuania 2019–2024
People from Linkuva
New Union (Social Liberals) politicians
Social Democratic Party of Lithuania MEPs
Vilnius University alumni
Women government ministers of Lithuania
Women members of the Seimas
21st-century Lithuanian politicians
Members of the Seimas